Martin Lee Sanders (born 1955–1956) is an American rapist, murderer, and suspected serial killer. A former truck driver, Sanders murdered at least two teenage girls in Washington and kidnapped two hitchhikers in Montana, raping one of them. He was apprehended in 1990 and sentenced to life imprisonment.

Crimes 
On the evening of May 20, 1983, Sanders murdered Rhonda Rima and Elizabeth Marks, two 15-year-old girls. The two were last seen at the Lilac Festival carnival in Spokane, Washington. Three weeks after their disappearances, their bodies were discovered in the Spokane River.

On May 18, 1986, Sanders, using an unloaded gun and handcuffs, kidnapped two hitchhikers in Missoula, Montana. He raped one of the victims in the sleeping compartment of his semi-truck. He was soon arrested for this crime and sentenced to 20 years in prison the following year.

Sanders is also suspected of murdering Marsha Weatter, 18, and Kathy Allen, 19 – two hitchhikers who were shot to death in Grant County between late March and early May 1980.

Arrest and trial 
Sanders became a suspect in the murders in 1989 after he confessed to his cellmate about the murders of Rima and Marks, revealing details about the murders that only the perpetrator would know. The inmate told authorities about Sanders' confession, and Sanders was extradited to Washington to face trial the next year. In order to avoid the death penalty, he plead guilty to the two murders and received a life sentence. He now resides at the Coyote Ridge Correctional Center in Cornell, Washington.

See also 

 Crime in Washington (state)
 Trucking industry in the United States
 List of serial killers in the United States

References 

1952 births
20th-century American criminals
American male criminals
American murderers of children
American people convicted of kidnapping
American people convicted of murder
American prisoners sentenced to life imprisonment
American rapists
American truck drivers
Crime in Montana
Criminals from Washington (state)
Living people
Prisoners sentenced to life imprisonment by Washington (state)
Suspected serial killers